Rijksdienst voor het Cultureel Erfgoed (RCE, Cultural Heritage Agency of the Netherlands) often abbreviated as Cultureel Erfgoed, is a Dutch heritage organisation working for the protection and conservation of National Heritage Sites. It is located in Amersfoort, province of Utrecht.

Responsibilities 

Cultureel Erfgoed is a department of the Dutch Ministry of Education, Culture and Science. Their responsibilities include managing the official list of Rijksmonumenten known as the Monumentenregister, (the storage and restoration of) the National art collection of the Netherlands, the National Archaeological Ship storage and fleet, and Archis, the central archaeological information system. They also subsidize grants in the fields of both movable and immovable cultural heritage. The RCE carries out the Dutch law known as the "Monumentenwet 1988" (English: Cultural property law), and wherever registered cultural heritage is threatened, the department takes action, whether by advising the proper authorities, by conducting public campaigns and education programs, or through legal action.

Registered city or village views considered to be important to the country's heritage (known as Beschermde stads- of dorpsgezichten) are also protected by the Rijksdienst voor Cultureel Erfgoed.

History
In 1875, the Dutch Ministry of Internal Affairs founded the department Kunsten en Wetenschap (Arts & Sciences), this department awarded grants  for cultural property restoration. In 1903 there was a Rijkscommissie tot het opmaken en uitgeven van een Inventaris en eene Beschrijving van de Nederlandsche monumenten van Geschiedenis en Kunst which in 1918 became the Rijksbureau voor de Monumentenzorg (Bureau for Cultural property Care). In 1947 this organisation was renamed to the Rijksdienst voor de Monumentenzorg. The archeological part of this organisation separated in 1947 into the Rijksdienst voor het Oudheidkundig Bodemonderzoek, which in 1995 merged with the Nederlands Instituut voor Scheeps- en onderwaterarcheologie (NISA). The archeological and cultural property departments merged in 2006 and became the Rijksdienst voor Archeologie, Cultuurlandschap en Monumenten (RACM). In 2009 this organisation was renamed to the Rijksdienst voor het Cultureel Erfgoed (RCE) it moved into a new building in Amersfoort.

Creative Commons

In April/May 2011 the RCE released its image collection of 550,000 images on beeldbank.cultureelerfgoed.nl. In September 2012 the first uploads to Wikimedia Commons were made. In December 2012 a bot was started to mass upload images. Approximately 450,000 images were uploaded.

See also

 List of Rijksmonuments
 List of World Heritage Sites in the Netherlands
 Rijksmonument

References

External links

Rijksdienst voor het Cultureel Erfgoed

Dutch culture
Netherlands
Organisations based in Utrecht (province)
Amersfoort
2006 establishments in the Netherlands
Organizations established in 2006
National heritage organizations
Photo archives in the Netherlands
21st-century architecture in the Netherlands